Puerto Rico Highway 39 (PR-39) is an urban road in Santurce. This is a short road that connects from the PR-1 (Expreso Luis Muñoz Rivera) to PR-26 (Expreso Román Baldorioty de Castro) and is parallel to PR-2. This road intersects with PR-35 (Avenida Manuel Fernández Juncos) and PR-25 (Avenida Juan Ponce de León). This road is called Calle Cerra.

Major intersections

See also

 List of highways numbered 39

References

External links
 

039
Roads in San Juan, Puerto Rico